The Chrysler AD platform was a truck platform used from 1972 through 1993. It was mainly used for pickup trucks like the Dodge D Series, thus the name. The AD platform was replaced by the Chrysler BE platform in 1994.

Applications:
 1972-1980 Dodge D Series (D/W 100-D/W 300)
 1972-? Fargo Truck (Canada/overseas)
 1974-1993 Dodge Ramcharger
 1974-1981 Plymouth Trail Duster (PD100, PW100) 
 1981-1993 Dodge Ram

AD